Éric Greff (born 19 July 1975 in Forbach, Moselle), better known by his aliases Helmut Fritz and Géronimo, is a French singer-songwriter and record producer. Greff is known for his 2009 single "Ça m'énerve", in which he portrays a German dandy living in Paris. The single, produced by Laurent Konrad, was released in March 2009 and rapidly reached number one in France.

To reinforce his identification with the song "Ça m'énerve", Éric Greff wrote a fictional biography for Helmut Fritz.

Fictional biography of Helmut Fritz
This biography is imaginary, it describes Helmut Fritz character's life, not Éric Greff's

Helmut Günter von Fritz was born in Reinbek, Germany, the only child of Rudy von Fritz and Annegret Spiegeln, who ran a small factory manufacturing knitted sweaters which earned them a modest but happy living.

In 1998, Helmut's great grand-uncle, Baron Titten von Fritz, died gored and trampled by wild boar while game hunting.  Helmut became the only heir to a 300-million Deutsche mark fortune.  Rich but stingy, he bought a second-hand Vespa, gave his parents some money, and left Germany.

He settled in Paris and began leading the high life with his newly acquired fortune.  However, his lifestyle weighed more and more heavily on him.

Suffering from profound boredom, Helmut broke down: parties, gallery openings, haute couture, etc. were all getting on his nerves.  Wishing to share his woes with someone, he met DJ Laurent Konrad, who suggested writing a song about his experiences.

Discography

Albums
His first album En Observation was released on 22 June 2009, available digitally since 15 June.
 En Observation – #32 in France, #63 in Belgium (Wallonia), #92 in Switzerland

Singles
 "Ça m'énerve" – #1 in France, #21 in Belgium (Flanders), #3 in Belgium (Wallonia), #8 in Switzerland
 "Miss France" – #7 in France, #15 in Belgium (Wallonia), #55 in Switzerland
 "Ça Gère" – #14 in France

References

1975 births
Living people
People from Forbach
21st-century French singers
21st-century French male singers